St. Francis Secondary School, Kota Kinabalu (Malay: SMK St. Francis Convent (M), Kota Kinabalu) is an all-girls secondary school and one of the oldest schools in Kota Kinabalu. The students in this school consist of different kinds of races regardless of religion despite being a mission school. The school building was once and formerly located in Jalan Kebajikan in the neighbourhood of Karamunsing next to the Sacred Heart Cathedral.
As of 2019, the school is being administered in the new school building in Bukit Padang.

History 
1922:
A convent was built by Franciscan Missionaries of St. Joseph (FMSJ) in Jesselton now known as Kota Kinabalu on a piece of land in Jalan Tunku Abdul Rahman. 
Sr. Rose Charnley, an Englishwoman and her 
fellow nun, a Dutchwoman named Sr. Gerarda Bonengaar who were formerly posted in Inobong and Limbahau, located in Penampang and Papar districts, respectively, were transferred in Jesselton to build up St. Francis Convent School. 
With help from Rev. Fr. Valentine Weber and Mr. Tay Bee Chuan, St. Francis Convent was the first successfully built all-girls school in Sabah. 
This school was divided into two portions, one to teach pupils English and another is to teach pupils Chinese.

1938:
School's ground was enlarged due to the increase of students.

1942–1945:
Due to the blaze of the Second World War, all school's activity was halted. In January 1943, all nuns and priests were sent to Kuching, Sarawak until Japan surrendered in August 1945. The war destroyed St. Francis Convent and all its records.

1946–1952:
The school was rebuilt and all activities resumed as before. Preschool classes even began with 15 pupils. At 1951, St. Francis was equipped with a boarding school to accommodate the increase in students. Uniforms were later introduced and changed a few times and finally replaced with uniforms used until 1972.

1955:
A block was separated in Jalan Tunku Abdul Rahman on the same land, beside a building. This block was later used as primary school from 1965 to 1993.

1959:
A new building was built in Jalan Kebajikan, Karamunsing. The school's construction idea was from Rev. Mother. St. John. All donations that were needed for the project were sincerely donated by parents, students, ex-students, friends and the Ministry of Education. This new building was designed by Mr. Morley, an architect from Boory & Edwards. While the contractor for this building was from the Metropolitan Construction Company.

1961–1969:
In 1961, a new building was officiated by the director of Education Department, Mr. G.D. Muir. Prefect systems were introduced in school later in 1962. St. Francis Convent preschool was moved to a new site in Jalan Kebajikan opposite of St. Francis Convent Secondary School. When Sabah joined the West in forming Malaysia, this school was placed under the Ministry of Education under the Education Law in 1961.

1970–1978:
After being administrated by the nuns from the west (White Franciscan Sisters) for more than 50 years, finally St. Francis Convent was handed over to local nuns (Franciscan Sisters). Sister Mary Cecilia was elected as the headmistress for the secondary school in January 1971. The administration board was formed in 1972. In 1977, bridge classes were first held.

1979–1997:
Due to the increase in students, classes during the afternoon were suggested and started in 1979. The school's Parents And Teachers Association Board (PTA) was formed in 1971, which consisted of parents and teachers. St. Francis Convent Primary School was successfully moved to Bukit Padang, Kota Kinabalu and the school's board planned to move the secondary school to the same site. The Primary School was moved because of a termite infestation. It was the contributions and co-operation of the school, PTA (Parents And Teachers Association Board), the body of administration and financial help from the government that has ensured the survival of St. Francis Primary School.

1998–2011:
A plan was established to build a new school building as well as the proposal for the school's new future site was commenced.

2012: 46 students from Forms 1 and 2 were rushed to Queen Elizabeth Hospital 1 (QEH 1), after an attack believed to have been the itch pollen from poisonous plants. The incident took place after their weekly assembly in an open-air hall at 3 pm. After assembly, one by one, the students complained of sudden itching on their hands, neck and face. Consequently, teachers had to take the students to the hospital. Of them, 32 were taken for treatment at the QEH 1 in nearby Kepayan Ridge, and 14 more to QEH 2 in Luyang. Most of the itching, the students had developed, was not severe, so most students were discharged from the hospitals at 7 pm.

School Anthem
English Version
St. Francis our school most dear,
May it prosper and advance
Towards ever greater heights and greater glory,
Its fame spread all around.

Let us keep its honour bright,
Untainted may it shine,
Together we will always help,
To love and lend a helping hand,
Our motto we'll uphold.

Ever faithful ever true we'll be to you,
Our Convent school,
In this lovely land below the wind,
We may be near we may be far,
But in our hearts, there'll always be
The true spirit of a Franciscan.

Malay Version
Kami warga St Francis,
Menjunjung taat setia,
Jujur dan berdisiplin
di sekolah yang tercinta.
Mari kita menuju teraju kejayaan,
Bersama kita mengharumkan,
Nama sekolah menengah,
St. Francis Konven.

Temanya berdedikasi, cintai,
Dan berbakti untuk,
Negara dan juga negeri,
Temanya berdedikasi, cintai
Dan berbakti untuk berjaya
St. Francis Konven.

References 

Educational institutions established in 1922
Schools in Sabah
Secondary schools in Malaysia
Catholic schools in Malaysia
1922 establishments in Sabah